George Lunn may refer to:

George Lunn (British politician) (1861–1939), chairman and president of the Liberal Party
George Lunn (footballer) (1915–2000), English footballer
George R. Lunn (1873–1948), U.S. Socialist and Democratic politician